Lesbian, gay, bisexual, and transgender (LGBT) persons in  Sint Maarten  may face legal challenges not experienced by non-LGBT residents. Both male and female same-sex sexual activity are legal in Sint Maarten, a constituent country of the Kingdom of the Netherlands, but same-sex marriage is not legal. Same-sex couples with Dutch nationality must travel to the Netherlands to get married, and that will not provide the rights of marriage in St Maarten.

Law regarding same-sex sexual activity
Same-sex sexual activity is legal in Sint Maarten. The age of consent is 15 and is equal for both heterosexual and homosexual intercourse.

Recognition of same-sex relationships

As part of the Kingdom of the Netherlands, Sint Maarten must recognize as valid same-sex marriages registered in the Netherlands (including Bonaire, Sint Eustatius and Saba). Same-sex couples cannot legally marry on the island, however.

In April 2015, representatives of all four constituent countries agreed that same-sex couples should have equal rights throughout the Kingdom.

In August 2015, in the case of Oliari and Others v Italy, the European Court of Human Rights (ECHR) ruled that it is discriminatory to provide no legal recognition to same-sex couples. The ECHR has jurisprudence over Sint Maarten.

Discrimination protections
The Sint Maarten Criminal Code, enacted in 2012, prohibits unfair discrimination and incitement to hatred and violence on various grounds, including "heterosexual or homosexual orientation". Article 1:221 describes discrimination as "any form of discrimination, exclusion, restriction or preference, which has the purpose or effect of impacting or affecting recognition, enjoyment or the exercise of human rights and fundamental liberties in political, economic, social or cultural fields or in other areas of social life." Articles 2:61 and 2:62 provide for penalties ranging from fines to one-year imprisonment.

Living conditions
Sint Maarten is noted as an LGBT-friendly travel destination, with various venues, hotels, beaches, bars and restaurants catering to LGBT clientele or otherwise advertising as welcoming. Numerous gay cruises visit the island every year. Sint Maarten society is described as tolerant of LGBT people, though gay magazines report that this tolerance "is more economic than social". Among the locals, discrimination and bullying tend to be more widespread, where there is a "subtle climate of homophobia". The presence of the Roman Catholic Church as the largest denomination on the island has also contributed to more societal prejudice, especially compared to the Netherlands. Nevertheless, locals are often described as having a "live and let live" mentality, and overt discrimination is very rare. There is, however, one known exception to this; in April 2006, a same-sex couple from New York City was attacked outside a bar with tire irons by four men yelling anti-gay slurs. The couple was sent to hospital for serious injuries. The Dutch and Sint Maarten governments denounced the attack as "barbaric and heinous". The men were convicted in November 2006 of public violence and grievous bodily harm, with penalties ranging from six months to three years' imprisonment. One of the men had expressed remorse and had tried to stop the attack, resulting in a lesser sentence.

There is one gay association on the island, known as Sint Maarten Alliance for Equality (SAFE). There is also an LGBT tourist website, Gaysxm. The website provides information on various venues and areas on the island for gay tourists. Gaysxm is an LGBT tourist information portal and has also other social media accounts where they give relevant information about gay life on the island.

Politics
The Democratic Party Sint Maarten and the United People's Party, which merged in 2017 to form the United Democrats, both supported same-sex marriage. The Sint Maarten Christian Party has expressed opposition to same-sex marriage, but has stated that it supports "equal protections against discrimination, bullying and violence".

Summary table

See also

LGBT rights in the Netherlands
LGBT rights in the Americas
LGBT rights in Aruba
LGBT rights in Curaçao
Same-sex marriage in Aruba, Curaçao and Sint Maarten
Politics of Sint Maarten

Notes

References